Khamees Saad Mubarak  is a UAE football forward who played for United Arab Emirates in the 1996 Asian Cup. He also played for Al Shabab

External links

1970 births
Living people
Emirati footballers
Association football forwards
United Arab Emirates international footballers
1992 AFC Asian Cup players
1996 AFC Asian Cup players
1997 FIFA Confederations Cup players
Al Shabab Al Arabi Club Dubai players
UAE Pro League players
Footballers at the 1994 Asian Games
Asian Games competitors for the United Arab Emirates